MV Herstein was a 5100 gross register ton freighter launched in 1938 at Copenhagen. She was sunk at Rabaul in 1942.

Herstein was utilised during World War II for transporting freight and took part in a number of convoys. After transporting troops and equipment to Port Moresby, she proceeded to Rabaul to load copra, however she was attacked by three dive bombers on 20 January 1942 with three bombs hitting amidships, one exploded in the engine room, resulting in a fire that quickly spread throughout the ship and the second exploded in the bridge area. She was abandoned and she drifted afloat ablaze until becoming beached in Rabaul Harbour. One crew member was killed as a result of the bombing. The rest of the crew were lost on the Montevideo Maru on 1 July 1942.

Citations

References
http://www.warsailors.com/singleships/herstein.html
http://www.wrecksite.eu/wreck.aspx?59375

Ships built in Copenhagen
Shipwrecks of Papua New Guinea
Ships sunk by Japanese aircraft
1938 ships
Ships of Nortraship
World War II shipwrecks in the Pacific Ocean
Merchant ships sunk by aircraft